Steatoda capensis is a spider originating from South Africa. Its common names include  the black cobweb spider, brown house spider, cupboard spider and due to its similarities to the katipō spider it is commonly known as the false katipō in New Zealand. Common throughout Southern Africa,  it has been introduced into other countries and is now present in Australia and throughout New Zealand. It is a small spider, usually an all-over shiny black. It may have a small bright red, orange, or yellow patch near the tip of the abdomen along with a crescent shaped band near the front of the abdomen.

It is thought that in some instances Steatoda capensis can bite humans causing a syndrome known as steatodism; which has been described as a less-severe form of latrodectism. Bites can be quite painful and can cause a general malaise for about a day.



Etymology
The species name of "capensis" refers to Cape Town, which is where the spider originates.

Taxonomy
Steatoda capensis was first described in 1904 as Teutana lepida by Octavius Pickard-Cambridge from specimens collected in South Africa. In 1977, T. lepida was moved to the Steatoda genus since Teutana had previously been recognized as a synonym of Steatoda. However, in 1990, it was recognized that there was separate species of spider named Steatoda lepida, so the species that was formerly T. lepida was renamed as Steatoda capensis.

Distribution/habitat 
Steatoda capensis is native to South Africa but is also found in Australia and New Zealand (where it is especially widespread in the latter). The spiders are synanthropic and frequently live on or in buildings. They also occur in a variety of other habitats such as sand dunes.

Ecology 
In New Zealand, Steatoda capensis occurs in sand dunes where the endemic katipō spider also occurs. The two spiders occupy similar niches to one another, but S. capensis can reproduce more quickly. Because of this, it is possible that S. capensis is slowly displacing katipō spiders from their native habitat, which may be a contributing factor in their declining population.

Interactions with humans 
Although not severe, S. capensis produce a painful bite when threatened. Bites are predominately inflicted by females, but males also have the potential to bite. Bites from S. capensis can cause steatodism, which can be thought of as a less severe form of latrodectism. Effects of the bite typically include localized pain and redness around the bite, but may also include nausea and headaches. Antivenom typically used for Latrodectus hasselti bites may also be effective on S. capensis bites.

Footnotes

External links

 Black cobweb or false katipō spider on the website of the Museum of New Zealand Te Papa Tongarewa

Steatoda
Spiders of South Africa
Spiders of Australia
Spiders of New Zealand
Spiders described in 1990